

Michelle Winters is a Canadian writer, translator and artist.

Winters was born in 1972 in Saint John, New Brunswick. As a founding member of Just in a Bowl Productions, she has co-written and performed in Unsinkable (2000) and The Hungarian Suicide Duel (2002). Her short stories have appeared in This Magazine, Taddle Creek, Dragnet and Matrix, and made her a nominee for the 2011 Journey Prize for short fiction. In 2017 she received a shortlisted Scotiabank Giller Prize nomination for her debut novel I Am a Truck.

She currently lives in Toronto, Ontario.

Publications
 I Am a Truck (novel), Invisible Publishing, Picton 2016 
 “The Canadian Grotesque”, in: Taddle Creek, No. 30 (Summer 2013).
 “Maintenance to six”, in: Dragnet Magazine, No. 8 (2013).
 “Toupée”, in: Sharon Bala et al. (ed.), The Journey Prize Stories 30: The Best of Canada's New Writers, McClelland & Stewart, Toronto 2018,

Translations
 Marie-Hélène Larochelle, Daniil and Vanya (Daniil et Vanya), Invisible Publishing, Picton 2020 
 Marie-Ève Comtois, My Planet of Kites (Je Te Trouve Belle Mon Homme), transl. with Stuart Ross, Mansfield Press, Toronto 2014,

Theatrical works
 The Hungarian Suicide Duel with Lori Delorme, Just in a Bowl Productions 2002.
 Unsinkable with Lori Delorme, Just in a Bowl Productions 2000.

References

External links 
 
 Short stories by Michelle Winters:
 “Toupée”, this.org (January 22, 2010), retrieved May 18, 2020.
 “The Canadian Grotesque”, taddlecreekmag.com (2013), retrieved May 18, 2020.
 “Maintenance to six”, cdn.shopify.com (July 2013). retrieved May 18, 2020.

21st-century Canadian novelists
21st-century Canadian short story writers
Canadian women novelists
Canadian women short story writers
Writers from Saint John, New Brunswick
Living people
21st-century Canadian women writers
1972 births